Specialized court is a type of court with limited subject-matter jurisdiction concerning particular field of law, compared to 'ordinary court' with general subject-matter jurisdiction. This concept of court usually includes administrative court or family court.

Specialized courts by country

Austria 

Under hierarchical chain of ordinary courts compared to administrative courts in Austria, specialized court for specific jurisdictions, including court on cartel cases and court on employment - social welfare cases are established in Vienna.

China 

Judiciary in the People's Republic of China includes the courts of special jurisdiction, translated as 'Specialized court' including matters concerning the military, national railway system and maritime disputes.

India 

In India, various types of specialized tribunals are established for each of specific matters, including offences Relating to Transactions in Securities, Atrocities against Scheduled Caste and Scheduled Tribes,  consuming Narcotic Drugs, violation on NIA act, Corruption. Supreme court has also setup 12 fast track special courts to exclusively deal with cases involving with MLA/MPs.

United Kingdom 

The judiciary of United Kingdom includes courts and tribunals for specific subject-matter jurisdictions, such as Employment Tribunal in England and Wales and Scotland, Family Court in England and Wales.

United States 

In the United States, special courts can handle both civil and criminal disputes. Some common forms of specialty courts include "Drug Courts," "Family Courts," "Mental Health Court," and "Traffic Courts". Drug Courts are separated into categories such as "Adult Drug Court", "Juvenile Drug Court", "DWI Court," and "Veteran's Treatment Court." In 2008, the first Veterans' Court was created. Of the older such courts, usually Article I tribunals, is the Court of Appeals for the Armed Forces founded in 1951 which functions as an appeal court for military and economic offences.

See also 

 Court
 Ordinary court
 Extraordinary court
 Administrative court
 Admiralty court
 Consumer Court
 Drug court
 Family court
 Juvenile court
 Labor court
 Patent court
 Social security tribunal
 Tax court
 Veterans' court

References

External links 
 List of National Specialised Courts in Europe, European e-Justice Portal

Courts by type
Judicial legal terminology